Eudonia isophaea is a moth of the family Crambidae. It is endemic to the Hawaiian island of Molokai.

External links

Eudonia
Endemic moths of Hawaii
Biota of Molokai
Moths described in 1904